BAA Buffalo was a planned basketball team in the Basketball Association of America (BAA), a forerunner of the modern National Basketball Association (NBA), based in Buffalo, New York. The franchise, which was granted on June 6, 1946, never played a game and was cancelled by the BAA on May 10, 1948.

See also
Basketball Association of America

References

Sports in Buffalo, New York
Defunct basketball teams in the United States
Basketball Association of America teams
Defunct National Basketball Association teams